The Olivenhain Dam is a gravity dam near Escondido, California. The dam was constructed between 1998 and 2003 as part of San Diego's Emergency Storage Project with the primary purpose of water supply for municipal use. It does not sit on a river or stream but is supplied with water by a system of pumps and pipes. The dam is connected to Lake Hodges and the Second San Diego Aqueduct. It is constructed of roller-compacted concrete and is the first of its type in California.

Construction
Ladd Associates excavated the dam's foundation and removed  of material on an $8.4 million contract. Construction on the actual dam began in 2000 by Kiewit Pacific and in 2001, Morrison Knudsen Corp received a $23 million contract to install the pipeline. Concrete was poured into the dam in  lifts and it was "topped off" on October 31, 2002. The entire structure to include the inlet/outlet works, crest roadway and mechanical work was complete in August 2003. A  park was also constructed around the dam and reservoir site.

The dam was designed by JV Parsons Engineering Science Inc and Harza Engineering Co. while being owned by the San Diego County Water Authority and the Olivenhain Municipal Water District.

See also
List of reservoirs and dams in California
San Vicente Dam

References

External links

San Diego County Water Authority - Olivenhain Dam
San Diego County Water Authority - Emergency Storage Project
Consultant's project page for the dam, including gallery

Dams in California
Buildings and structures in San Diego County, California
Gravity dams
United States local public utility dams
Dams completed in 2003
Roller-compacted concrete dams
2003 establishments in California